The 2009–10 season was Birmingham City Football Club's sixth season in the Premier League and their 56th in the first tier of English football. The side was managed by former Scotland manager Alex McLeish, who successfully guided the side to promotion from the Championship the previous season.

Review

Carson Yeung takeover
Following his unsuccessful attempt to purchase the club during the 2007–08 season, Carson Yeung returned to complete a deal to purchase Birmingham City.

On 20 August, Carson Yeung's Hong Kong Stock Exchange-listed Grandtop International placed a deposit of £3 million ahead of a new proposed takeover bid. This was quickly followed by Yeung's decision to donate £5 million to the club for the purchase of Middlesbrough's Tuncay, but such a gift would have broken HKSE rules, and the player signed for Stoke City instead.

The takeover date was put back from October to mid-November, because of a delay to the EGM required to approve the issue of an additional 50% shares, following his capture of a £57m bridging loan to cover the purchase of the club.

Formal documents outlining Yeung's £1-per-share offer were sent out to club shareholders in mid-September. By 24 September, he had acceptances on 81.7% of the shares, including the holdings of former owners David Sullivan, David Gold and Ralph Gold, and by the closing date of 6 October, the takeover was complete, with acceptances in respect of 94% of the shares, a level allowing a compulsory purchase of the remainder.

At a press conference on 15 October, the board and executive was named as: Yeung himself, president; Michael Wiseman, vice-president; Vico Hui, chairman; Peter Pannu and Sammy Yu, vice chairmen; and Michael Dunford, chief executive. The name of the holding company was changed from Grandtop International to Birmingham International Holdings.

Chronological list of events
The following is a list of all significant events to occur during the 2009–10 season. This list does not include transfers, which are listed in the transfer section, or results, which are listed in the matches section.

7 July: The club broke its transfer record by signing Christian Benítez from Mexican side Santos Laguna for a fee that will rise to $12.5 million (around £7.75m).
7 August: Co-owner David Sullivan and managing director Karren Brady were told that no further action would be taken against them after a two-year investigation into corruption in football.
14 August: Vice-chairman Jack Wiseman died at the age of 92.
17 November: Former Aberdeen player Malky Thomson is appointed as reserve team manager.
8 January: Alex McLeish was awarded the manager of the month award for December.
3 February: Former Birmingham goalkeeper and manager Gil Merrick died at the age of 88.

Pre-season

Premier League

Match details
General sources (match reports): Match content not verifiable from these sources is referenced individually.

League table

Results summary

FA Cup

League Cup

Birmingham entered the 2009–10 League Cup in the second round. The draw saw them travel down to the south coast to play League One team Southampton for the second time in consecutive seasons. Goals from midfielders Lee Carsley and Lee Bowyer cancelled out Adam Lallana's strike to see Birmingham progress to the next round 2–1. In the third round, Birmingham visited fellow Premier League side Sunderland. An early goal from Jordan Henderson and a strike by Fraizer Campbell midway through the first half was enough to see Birmingham knocked out of the cup 2–0.

Appearances and goals
Source:

Numbers in parentheses denote appearances as substitute.
Players with squad numbers struck through and marked  left the club during the playing season.
Players with names in italics and marked * were on loan from another club for the whole of their season with Birmingham.

a. Soccerbase's stats exclude Birmingham's opening goal against Burnley on 1 May, originally credited as a Brian Jensen own goal but awarded to Jerome by the Dubious Goals Panel.

Transfers

Before the start of the season, Stephen Carr was given a new two-year contract and Cameron Jerome signed a five-year deal. Youngsters Jacob Rowe and Shaun Timmins were given their first professional one-year contracts and Jared Wilson received a one-year extension.

In

 Brackets round club names indicate the player's contract with that club had expired before he joined Birmingham.

Out

 Brackets round club names denote the player joined that club after his Birmingham City contract expired.

Loan in

Loan out

Transfer notes
 It is believed that the fee paid for Scott Dann is in the region of £3.5 million.
 Birmingham City did not mention an official cost for Giovanny Espinoza. Newspaper reports suggest that the fee was lower than €600,000 (£375,000).
 A fee and personal terms for Benítez were agreed on 3 June 2009, but were later renegotiated after a problem with Benítez's knee was discovered during his medical. Benítez officially joined the club on 7 July 2009. The fee for Benítez is thought to be $2 million (about £1.2 million) rising to $12.5 million (about £7.75 million) with add-ons, and also includes a 'get out' clause that will see him return to Mexico at the end of the season if his knee problem becomes serious.
 It was announced on 15 May 2009 that Artur Krysiak would be released from the club when his contract expired on 30 June 2009. It was later announced that the side had re-signed the Polish goalkeeper.
 Radhi Jaïdi, Stephen Kelly and Mehdi Nafti all left the club when their contracts expired. Kelly joined Fulham, while Nafti joined Greek side Aris Thessaloniki. Jaïdi signed for Southampton on 2 September 2009.
 Robin Shroot was originally loaned out to Burton Albion for the season, but was later cancelled, with the player returning to Birmingham on 1 January.
 Artur Krysiak's loan deal with Burton Albion was originally a one-month loan deal. This was extended until January on 1 September. The deal was further extended on 24 December to cover the remainder of the season.
 Jordon Mutch's loan deal to Hereford United, and later to Doncaster Rovers, were both Football League Youth Loans. This meant he would still be eligible for Birmingham City reserve and academy fixtures, but Hereford/Doncaster fixtures would take priority if on the same day.

References

Birmingham City F.C. seasons
Birmingham City